Hummuli is a small borough in Valga County, in southern Estonia. It was the administrative centre of Hummuli Parish. Hummuli has a population of 379 (as of 1 January 2010).

In 1702 the Battle of Hummelshof, part of the Great Northern War, took place near Hummuli.

Hummuli manor
Hummuli manor has a history that goes back to at least 1470. The present-day building however dates from the 1860s, when the manor belonged to the local aristocrats von Samson-Himmelstjerna, who were the owners of the estate right up until 1914. Today the manor houses a school, and although a few interior details remain, the interior layout of the neo-Gothic building has changed drastically.

In 1919 a battle of the Estonian War of Independence took place near Hummuli manor.

References

External links
Hummuli Parish 
Hummuli Manor at Estonian Manors Portal

Boroughs and small boroughs in Estonia
Kreis Fellin